North Manchester was, from 1896 to 1916, a township within the Poor Law Union of Manchester, England. North Manchester was a local government sub-district used for the administration of Poor Law legislation; it was an inter-parish unit for social security. Although abolished in 1916, the name North Manchester endured for the area, and is still applied to the northern parts of the city, for instance as a registration district up until 1974.

As a township, North Manchester encompassed the civil parishes of Beswick, Blackley, Bradford, Cheetham, Clayton, Collyhurst, Crumpsall, Harpurhey, Moston and Newton Heath, all of which had been amalgamated into Manchester during the mid-to-late 19th century.

See also
Manchester Township (England)

References

History of Manchester
1896 establishments in the United Kingdom
1916 disestablishments in the United Kingdom